Fanbo Zeng (born January 11, 2003) is a Chinese professional basketball player for the Beijing Ducks of the Chinese Basketball Association (CBA). Zeng committed to Gonzaga University in November of 2020, but later instead chose to withdraw from his college choice and compete with NBA G League Ignite. At the high school level, he played for Windermere Preparatory School in Windermere, Florida. Zeng was a consensus four-star recruit and a former Gonzaga commit.

Early life and high school career
Zeng was born in Harbin in the Chinese province of Heilongjiang. At age eleven, he joined the youth program of the Beijing Ducks. For his freshman year of high school, Zeng moved to the United States, enrolling at Windermere Preparatory School in Windermere, Florida. As a sophomore, he averaged 15.5 points, 7.2 rebounds and 2.6 blocks per game, earning Class 3A All-State first team honors. He returned to China after the season and was unable to rejoin the team in his junior season due to COVID-19 travel restrictions. He also bypassed his senior year.

Recruiting
Zeng was a consensus four-star recruit and was considered "China's top basketball prospect" by The Athletic. On November 21, 2020, he committed to playing college basketball for Gonzaga over offers from Florida State, Florida and Virginia Tech, among others. On April 24, 2021, he decommitted from Gonzaga with the intention of joining the NBA G League Ignite, in part because of the departure of assistant coach Tommy Lloyd, who had recruited him to Gonzaga.

Professional career

NBA G League Ignite (2021) 
On October 13, 2021, Zeng signed with the NBA G League Ignite of the NBA G League. On June 25th, 2022, Fanbo Zeng signed an Exhibit 10 contract with the Indiana Pacers.

National team career
Zeng was expected to represent China at the 2020 FIBA Under-17 Basketball World Cup in Sofia, but the event was postponed due to the COVID-19 pandemic.

References

2003 births
Living people
Basketball players from Heilongjiang
Chinese men's basketball players
Chinese expatriate basketball people in the United States
NBA G League Ignite players
Power forwards (basketball)
Small forwards
Sportspeople from Harbin